This is the list of current members of the Provincial Assembly of Sindh elected following the 2018 provincial election.

Members

Former members
 Imran Ismail (oath 13 August 2018), resigned to become Governor
 Muhammad Wajahat (oath 13 August 2018), died on 28 November 2018
 Ghulam Shah Jeelani (oath 13 August 2018), died on 13 September 2019
 Ali Mardan Shah (oath 13 August 2018), died on 19 January 2020

References

2018 Pakistani general election
Lists of current office-holders in Pakistan